The 1968 Kent State Golden Flashes football team was an American football team that represented Kent State University in the Mid-American Conference (MAC) during the 1968 NCAA University Division football season. In their first season under head coach Dave Puddington, the Golden Flashes compiled a 1–9 record (1–5 against MAC opponents), finished in sixth place in the MAC, and were outscored by all opponents by a combined total of 230 to 101.

The team's statistical leaders included Don Nottingham with 727 rushing yards, Steve Trustdorf with 773 passing yards, and Doug Smith with 247 receiving yards. Defensive tackle Jim Corrigall was selected as a first-team All-MAC player.

Puddington was hired as Kent State's head football coach in December 1967. He had been the head football coach at Washington University in St. Louis from 1962 to 1967.

Schedule

References

Kent State
Kent State Golden Flashes football seasons
Kent State Golden Flashes football